This article shows the roster of all participating teams at the men's water polo tournament at the 2022 World Aquatics Championships.

Group A

The following is Brazilian roster in the Water polo at the 2022 World Aquatics Championships – Men's tournament.

Head coach:  Bárbaro Díaz

 
1 Guilherme Barrella 
2 Logan Cabral 
3 Filipe Lacerda 
4 Gustavo Coutinho 
5 Roberto Freitas 
6 Marcos Paulo Pedroso 
7 Rafael Real 
8 Eduardo De Paula 
9 Bruno Chiappini 
10 Italo Vizacre 
11 Gustavo Guimarães 
12 Luis Ricardo Silva 
13 Alexandre Mendes

The following is Georgian roster in the Water polo at the 2022 World Aquatics Championships – Men's tournament.

Head coach:  Dejan Stanojević

 
1 Irakli Razmadze 
2 Sandro Adeishvili 
3 Valiko Dadvani 
4 Nika Shushiashvili 
5 Andria Bitadze 
6 Marko Jelaca 
7 Khvicha Jakhaia 
8 Jovan Sarić 
9 Revaz Imnaishvili 
10 Boris Vapenski 
11 Fabio Baraldi 
12 Dušan Vasić 
13 Nikoloz Shubladze

The following is Hungarian roster in the Water polo at the 2022 World Aquatics Championships – Men's tournament.

Head coach: Tamás Märcz

 
1 Márton Lévai 
2 Dániel Angyal 
3 Krisztián Manhercz 
4 Zoltán Pohl 
5 Márton Vámos 
6 Tamás Mezei 
7 Gergő Zalánki 
8 Gergely Burián 
9 Ádám Nagy 
10 Dénes Varga 
11 Szilárd Jansik 
12 Balázs Hárai 
13 Soma Vogel

The following is Montenegrin roster in the Water polo at the 2022 World Aquatics Championships – Men's tournament.

Head coach: Vladimir Gojković

 
1 Dejan Lazović 
2 Marko Mršić 
3 Uroš Vučurović 
4 Konstantin Averka 
5 Uroš Čučković 
6 Vlado Popadić 
7 Vasilije Radović 
8 Bogdan Đurđić 
9 Miroslav Perković 
10 Dušan Banićević 
11 Dušan Matković 
12 Marko Petković 
13 Petar Tešanović

Group B

The following is Croatian roster in the Water polo at the 2022 World Aquatics Championships – Men's tournament.

Head coach: Ivica Tucak

 
1 Marko Bijač 
2 Rino Burić 
3 Loren Fatović 
4 Ivan Krapić 
5 Franko Lazić 
6 Luka Bukić 
7 Ante Vukičević 
8 Marko Žuvela 
9 Jerko Marinić Kragić 
10 Josip Vrlić 
11 Andrija Bašić 
12 Konstantin Kharkov 
13 Toni Popadić

The following is German roster in the Water polo at the 2022 World Aquatics Championships – Men's tournament.

Head coach:  Petar Porobić

 
1 Moritz Schenkel 
2 Zoran Božić 
3 Ferdinand Korbel 
4 Jan Rotermund 
5 Fynn Schütze 
6 Maurice Jüngling 
7 Dennis Strelezkij 
8 Lukas Küppers 
9 Philipp Dolff 
10 Phillip Kubisch 
11 Niclas Schipper 
12 Mark Gansen 
13 Kevin Götz

The following is Greek roster in the Water polo at the 2022 World Aquatics Championships – Men's tournament.

Head coach: Thodoris Vlachos

 
1 Emmanouil Zerdevas 
2 Konstantinos Genidounias 
3 Dimitrios Skoumpakis 
4 Efstathios Kalogeropoulos 
5 Ioannis Fountoulis 
6 Alexandros Papanastasiou 
7 Georgios Dervisis 
8 Stylianos Argyropoulos 
9 Konstantinos Gouvis 
10 Konstantinos Kakaris 
11 Dimitrios Nikolaidis 
12 Angelos Vlachopoulos 
13 Panagiotis Tzortzatos

The following is Japanese roster in the Water polo at the 2022 World Aquatics Championships – Men's tournament.

Head coach: Yoshinori Shiota

 
1 Katsuyuki Tanamura 
2 Seiya Adachi 
3 Taiyo Watanabe 
4 Daichi Ogihara 
5 Yuki Maita 
6 Toi Suzuki 
7 Kiyomu Date 
8 Mitsuru Takata 
9 Atsushi Arai 
10 Yusuke Inaba 
11 Keigo Okawa 
12 Kenta Araki 
13 Tomoyoshi Fukushima

Group C

The following is Canadian roster in the Water polo at the 2022 World Aquatics Championships – Men's tournament.

Head coach: Patrick Oaten

 
1 Milan Radenović 
2 Gaelan Geddes Patterson 
3 Bogdan Djerković 
4 Nicolas Constantin-Bicari 
5 Matt Halajian 
6 Jérémie Blanchard 
7 Jeremie Cote 
8 Sean Spooner 
9 Aleksa Gardijan 
10 Aria Soleimanipak 
11 Jason O'Donnell 
12 Reuel D'Souza 
13 Brody McKinght

The following is Italian roster in the Water polo at the 2022 World Aquatics Championships – Men's tournament.

Head coach: Alessandro Campagna

 
1 Marco Del Lungo 
2 Francesco Di Fulvio 
3 Luca Damonte 
4 Matteo Iocchi Gratta 
5 Andrea Fondelli 
6 Giacomo Cannella 
7 Luca Marziali 
8 Gonzalo Echenique 
9 Nicholas Presciutti 
10 Lorenzo Bruni 
11 Edoardo Di Somma 
12 Vincenzo Dolce 
13 Gianmarco Nicosia

The following is South African roster in the Water polo at the 2022 World Aquatics Championships – Men's tournament.

Head coach: Vaughn Marlow

 
1 Lwazi Madi 
2 Ignardus Badenhorst 
3 Niall Wheeler 
4 Todd James Howard 
5 Farouk Mayman 
6 Roarke Olver 
7 Cameron Bain Laurenson 
8 Dane Tucker 
9 Dylan Cronje 
10 Ross Stuart Stone 
11 Chad Roman 
12 Jonathan Swanepoel 
13 Lonwabo Mfikili

The following is Spanish roster in the Water polo at the 2022 World Aquatics Championships – Men's tournament.

Head coach: David Martín

 
1 Unai Aguirre 
2 Alberto Munárriz 
3 Álvaro Granados 
4 Bernat Sanahuja 
5 Miguel de Toro 
6 Marc Larumbe 
7 Martin Famera 
8 Sergi Cabanas 
9 Roger Tahull 
10 Felipe Perrone 
11 Blai Mallarach 
12 Alejandro Bustos 
13 Eduardo Lorrio

Group D

The following is Australian roster in the Water polo at the 2022 World Aquatics Championships – Men's tournament.

Head coach: Tim Hamill

 
1 Nick Porter 
2 Keenan Marsden 
3 George Ford 
4 Charlie Negus 
5 Nathan Power 
6 Tom McJannett 
7 Luke Pavillard 
8 Rhys Holden 
9 Reilly Townsend 
10 Timothy Putt 
11 Chaz Poot 
12 Blake Edwards 
13 John Hedges

The following is Kazakh roster in the Water polo at the 2022 World Aquatics Championships – Men's tournament.

Head coach: Rustam Ukumanov

 
1 Madikhan Makhmetov 
2 Eduard Tsoy 
3 Anatoliy Pustovalov 
4 Srđan Vuksanović 
5 Maxim Lamayev 
6 Danil Artyukh 
7 Murat Shakenov 
8 Yegor Berbelyuk 
9 Ruslan Akhmetov 
10 Alexey Shmider 
11 Timur Khassanov 
12 Sultan Shonzhigitov 
13 Pavel Lipilin

The following is Serbian roster in the Water polo at the 2022 World Aquatics Championships – Men's tournament.

Head coach: Dejan Savić

 
1 Lazar Dobožanov 
2 Dušan Mandić 
3 Gavril Subotić 
4 Sava Ranđelović 
5 Đorđe Lazić 
6 Nemanja Vico 
7 Strahinja Rašović 
8 Nikola Lukić 
9 Nikola Jakšić 
10 Marko Radulović 
11 Radomir Drašović 
12 Viktor Rašović 
13 Branislav Mitrović

The following is American roster in the Water polo at the 2022 World Aquatics Championships – Men's tournament.

Head coach:  Dejan Udovičić

 
1 Adrian Weinberg 
2 Chase Dodd 
3 Marko Vavić 
4 Thomas Gruwell 
5 Hannes Daube 
6 Jake Ehrhardt 
7 Ben Hallock 
8 Dylan Woodhead 
9 Alexander Bowen 
10 Benjamin Stevenson 
11 Matthew Farmer 
12 Maxwell Irving 
13 Drew Holland

References

External links
Official website
Records and statistics (reports by Omega)

World Aquatics Championships water polo squads
Men's team rosters